Bally's Quad Cities, formerly Jumer's Casino & Hotel, is a casino hotel in Rock Island, Illinois, part of the Quad Cities area. It is owned and operated by Bally's Corporation. It is one of the largest land-based casinos in the state of Illinois.

Bally's was voted the Quad Cities' #1 casino according to a poll conducted by the Quad City Times.

History

In June 2002, the Illinois House of Representatives gives Jumer's Casino Rock Island permission to move away from downtown Rock Island to a site near the intersection of Interstate 280 and Illinois 92. In October 2007, Jumer's Casino Rock Island broke ground on a $151 million land-based casino, hotel and banquet center, and on December 1, 2008, Jumer's opened its new Las Vegas-style casino and hotel in southwest Rock Island. The 43,000-square-foot casino has about 1,000 slots and 18 table games as well as a live poker room and a high-limit slots area. The complex includes a 205-room hotel with 11 luxury suites, an event center, a nightclub and four restaurants. DJ's Steakhouse is named after the company's founder, D. James Jumer.

The 2011 Best of Gaming results were published in the magazine's August edition. Jumer's was voted best in 11 separate categories for the Northern Illinois region.

In 2011, the Jumer family sold the property to Delaware North for $180 million.

In June 2021, Delaware North sold Jumer's to Bally's Corporation for $120 million. The property was rebranded as Bally's Quad Cities in September 2021.

Gaming and Leisure Properties purchased the real estate of Bally's Quad Cities in a leaseback transaction in April 2022.

References

External links

Casinos in Illinois
Hotels in Illinois
Casino hotels
Casinos completed in 2008